Baranzai is also a name of Baloch Tribe who live in Sistan and Baluchestan Province , Mir Dost Mohammad Khan Baloch was a Baranzai origin,  who ruled Western Balochistan till 1928.

Baranzai is a clan of the Balochi tribe of Mengal is a large tribe and its notable clans are Shahizai, Lehri, and Mahmudzai.

References

Baloch tribes